Bolcyrus is an extinct genus of prehistoric bony fish that lived from the early to middle Eocene.

Subspecies
 Bolcyrus bajai Blot 1975
 Bolcyrus formosissimus Eastman 1905

Fossil record
Fossils of Bolcyrus have been found in the Eocene of Italy and Virginia (age range: from 55.8 to 40.4 million years ago.).

See also

 Prehistoric fish
 List of prehistoric bony fish

Bibliography
 Eastman C.R., 1905 - Les types de poissons fossiles du Monte Bolca au Museum d'Histoire Naturelle de Paris, fasc. 1, t. 13, mém. 34, p. 31
 Blot J., 1978 - Les apodes fossiles du Monte Bolca, fasc. 1, vol. 3, p. 260
 Rita S. Mehta, Andrea B. Ward, Michael E. Alfaro and Peter C. Wainwright Elongation of the Body in Eels

References

External links
 The Fossil Forum
 MNHN

Eocene fish
Eocene fish of North America